James Rene (born 2 February 1986) is a Turks and Caicos Islander international footballer who plays for the Turks and Caicos Islands national football team, as a defender.

Club career
Rene has represented Provo Premier League clubs AFC Academy and Full Physic, managing the latter alongside fellow Turks and Caicos international Marc Fenelus. Rene also captained the University of East London's futsal team.

International career
On 9 July 2011, Rene made his debut for the Turks and Caicos Islands in a 6–0 loss against the Bahamas. Rene has also captained the Turks and Caicos' beach soccer team.

References

1986 births
Living people
People from Cap-Haïtien
Haitian footballers
Turks and Caicos Islands footballers
Turks and Caicos Islands international footballers
Association football defenders
Haitian expatriate sportspeople in England
Beach soccer players
Futsal defenders
Futsal players in England
Turks and Caicos Islands football managers
Alumni of the University of East London
AFC Academy players
Association football player-managers